Blame It on the Fish: An Abstract Look at the 2003 Primus Tour de Fromage is a DVD by Primus that was released on October 17, 2006. It was directed by Matthew J. Powers and produced by Powers Philms and Frizzle Fry Inc. This DVD contains 70 minutes of the movie, 90 minutes of extras and interviews taken from Primus' 2003 Tour de Fromage. It also shows random clips between songs and interviews. The title of the DVD stems from an incident in the film where drummer Tim Alexander successfully performs after getting food poisoning from bad fish at a restaurant.

The band requested that the film be abstract, artistic, and that the songs not be shown in their entirety.

Track list
"Mr. Krinkle" (from Pork Soda)
"Jerry Was a Race Car Driver" (from Sailing the Seas of Cheese)
"Southbound Pachyderm" (from Tales from the Punchbowl)
"De Anza Jig" (from Tales from the Punchbowl)
"Over The Electric Grapevine" (from Tales from the Punchbowl)
"Hello Skinny" (The Residents cover, from Duck Stab/Buster & Glen)
"Nature Boy" (from Pork Soda)
"Bob" (from Pork Soda)
"Mary the Ice Cube" (from Animals Should Not Try to Act Like People)
"Pilcher's Squad" (from Animals Should Not Try to Act Like People)
"American Life" (from Sailing the Seas of Cheese)
"Mr. Knowitall" (from Frizzle Fry)

Lineup
Tim Alexander - Drums
Les Claypool - Bass Guitar, Vocals, Upright Bass
Larry LaLonde - Guitar, Banjo, Backing vocals

Primus (band) video albums
2006 video albums
Prawn Song Records video albums